The arrondissement of Périgueux is an arrondissement of France in the Dordogne department in the Nouvelle-Aquitaine region. It has 143 communes.

Composition

The communes of the arrondissement of Périgueux, and their INSEE codes, are:

 Agonac (24002)
 Allemans (24007)
 Annesse-et-Beaulieu (24010)
 Antonne-et-Trigonant (24011)
 Bassillac et Auberoche (24026)
 Beaupouyet (24029)
 Beauregard-et-Bassac (24031)
 Beauronne (24032)
 Beleymas (24034)
 Bertric-Burée (24038)
 Boulazac Isle Manoire (24053)
 Bourg-des-Maisons (24057)
 Bourg-du-Bost (24058)
 Bourgnac (24059)
 Bourrou (24061)
 Bouteilles-Saint-Sébastien (24062)
 Campsegret (24077)
 Celles (24090)
 Chalagnac (24094)
 Champagne-et-Fontaine (24097)
 Champcevinel (24098)
 Chancelade (24102)
 Chantérac (24104)
 Chapdeuil (24105)
 La Chapelle-Gonaguet (24108)
 La Chapelle-Grésignac (24109)
 La Chapelle-Montabourlet (24110)
 Chassaignes (24114)
 Château-l'Évêque (24115)
 Cherval (24119)
 Clermont-de-Beauregard (24123)
 Comberanche-et-Épeluche (24128)
 Cornille (24135)
 Coulounieix-Chamiers (24138)
 Coursac (24139)
 Coutures (24141)
 Creyssac (24144)
 Creyssensac-et-Pissot (24146)
 Douchapt (24154)
 La Douze (24156)
 Douville (24155)
 Douzillac (24157)
 Échourgnac (24159)
 Église-Neuve-de-Vergt (24160)
 Église-Neuve-d'Issac (24161)
 Escoire (24162)
 Eygurande-et-Gardedeuil (24165)
 Eyraud-Crempse-Maurens (24259)
 Fouleix (24190)
 Gout-Rossignol (24199)
 Grand-Brassac (24200)
 Grignols (24205)
 Grun-Bordas (24208)
 Issac (24211)
 Jaure (24213)
 La Jemaye-Ponteyraud (24216)
 Lacropte (24220)
 Les Lèches (24234)
 Léguillac-de-l'Auche (24236)
 Lisle (24243)
 Lusignac (24247)
 Manzac-sur-Vern (24251)
 Marsac-sur-l'Isle (24256)
 Ménesplet (24264)
 Mensignac (24266)
 Montagnac-la-Crempse (24285)
 Montagrier (24286)
 Montpon-Ménestérol (24294)
 Montrem (24295)
 Moulin-Neuf (24297)
 Mussidan (24299)
 Nanteuil-Auriac-de-Bourzac (24303)
 Neuvic (24309)
 Parcoul-Chenaud (24316)
 Paunat (24318)
 Paussac-et-Saint-Vivien (24319)
 Périgueux (24322)
 Petit-Bersac (24323)
 Le Pizou (24329)
 Razac-sur-l'Isle (24350)
 Ribérac (24352)
 La Roche-Chalais (24354)
 Saint-Amand-de-Vergt (24365)
 Saint-André-de-Double (24367)
 Saint-Aquilin (24371)
 Saint-Astier (24372)
 Saint-Aulaye-Puymangou (24376)
 Saint-Barthélemy-de-Bellegarde (24380)
 Saint-Crépin-d'Auberoche (24390)
 Saint-Étienne-de-Puycorbier (24399)
 Saint-Front-de-Pradoux (24409)
 Saint-Georges-de-Montclard (24414)
 Saint-Germain-du-Salembre (24418)
 Saint-Geyrac (24421)
 Saint-Hilaire-d'Estissac (24422)
 Saint-Jean-d'Ataux (24424)
 Saint-Jean-d'Estissac (24426)
 Saint-Just (24434)
 Saint-Laurent-des-Hommes (24436)
 Saint-Léon-sur-l'Isle (24442)
 Saint-Louis-en-l'Isle (24444)
 Saint-Martial-Viveyrol (24452)
 Saint-Martial-d'Artenset (24449)
 Saint-Martin-de-Ribérac (24455)
 Saint-Martin-des-Combes (24456)
 Saint-Martin-l'Astier (24457)
 Saint-Mayme-de-Péreyrol (24459)
 Saint-Méard-de-Drône (24460)
 Saint-Médard-de-Mussidan (24462)
 Saint-Michel-de-Double (24465)
 Saint-Michel-de-Villadeix (24468)
 Saint-Pardoux-de-Drône (24477)
 Saint-Paul-Lizonne (24482)
 Saint-Paul-de-Serre (24480)
 Saint-Pierre-de-Chignac (24484)
 Saint Privat en Périgord (24490)
 Saint-Sauveur-Lalande (24500)
 Saint-Sulpice-de-Roumagnac (24504)
 Saint-Séverin-d'Estissac (24502)
 Saint-Victor (24508)
 Saint-Vincent-Jalmoutiers (24511)
 Saint-Vincent-de-Connezac (24509)
 Salon (24518)
 Sanilhac (24312)
 Sarliac-sur-l'Isle (24521)
 Savignac-les-Églises (24527)
 Segonzac (24529)
 Servanches (24533)
 Siorac-de-Ribérac (24537)
 Sorges et Ligueux en Périgord (24540)
 Sourzac (24543)
 Tocane-Saint-Apre (24553)
 La Tour-Blanche-Cercles (24554)
 Trélissac (24557)
 Val de Louyre et Caudeau (24362)
 Vallereuil (24562)
 Vanxains (24564)
 Vendoire (24569)
 Vergt (24571)
 Verteillac (24573)
 Veyrines-de-Vergt (24576)
 Villamblard (24581)
 Villetoureix (24586)

History

The arrondissement of Périgueux was created in 1800. At the January 2017 reorganisation of the arrondissements of Dordogne, it gained 21 communes from the arrondissement of Bergerac, and it lost 28 communes to the arrondissement of Nontron and 22 communes to the arrondissement of Sarlat-la-Canéda.

As a result of the reorganisation of the cantons of France which came into effect in 2015, the borders of the cantons are no longer related to the borders of the arrondissements. The cantons of the arrondissement of Périgueux were, as of January 2015:

 Brantôme
 Excideuil
 Hautefort
 Montagrier
 Montpon-Ménestérol
 Mussidan
 Neuvic
 Périgueux-Centre
 Périgueux-Nord-Est
 Périgueux-Ouest
 Ribérac
 Saint-Astier
 Saint-Aulaye
 Saint-Pierre-de-Chignac
 Savignac-les-Églises
 Thenon
 Vergt
 Verteillac

References

 
Perigueux